XHRO-FM is a radio station on 95.5 FM in Guadalajara. The station is owned by MVS Radio and carries its La Mejor grupera format.

History
XHRO received its first concession on December 17, 1968. It was owned by Elsa Gabriela Guajardo de Vargas, the wife of MVS founder Joaquín Vargas Gómez.

The station carried the Stereorey format until the early 2000s.

References

Radio stations in Guadalajara
Radio stations established in 1968
MVS Radio